The Battle of Wisniowiec (also known as the Battle of Lopuszno) took place on 28 April 1512.

The combined Polish–Lithuanian forces under Grand Crown Hetman Mikołaj Kamieniecki and  Grand Lithuanian Hetman Konstanty Ostrogski defeated the raid of the Crimean Tatars. The battle was fought in Lopushne near Wisniowiec.

References 

Conflicts in 1512
Battles involving the Crimean Khanate
Battles involving the Grand Duchy of Lithuania
Battles involving Poland
Military history of Ukraine